Frederick Murphy may refer to:
 F. A. Murphy, virologist associated with rabies and Ebola
 Frederick C. Murphy (1918–1945), Medal of Honor recipient